Saraçoğlu Sport Complex is a multi-purpose outdoor arena in Karatay, Konya, Turkey.

The sport complex is located at Telsiz St. in Karatay district of Konya, Turkey. Competitions in sports branches like  field hockey, shooting (trap and skeet), field archery and basketball, can be held at the complex.

The venue hosted the shooting and the archery competitions at the 2021 Islamic Solidarity Games.

References

Sports venues in Konya
Archery venues
Field hockey venues
Shooting ranges in Turkey
Basketball venues in Turkey
Karatay District